La Rambla | Drassanes is a Barcelona Metro station located underneath Portal de la Santa Madrona, just off La Rambla in the Ciutat Vella district of Barcelona. It is named after the nearby Drassanes Reials de Barcelona, the old shipyards that are now the home of the Museu Marítim de Barcelona. It is the closest station to the Port of Barcelona and one of the network's closest stations to the sea, and is served by TMB-operated Barcelona Metro line L3.

The station was opened on 14 December 1968 as a prolongation on the line from Liceu once Fernando metro station was closed. Originally known as Atarazanas, the name was changed to Drassanes in 1982, then La Rambla | Drassanes in 2022. Due to its proximity to the sea and low level, the station has suffered from flooding in the past. It was completely rebuilt in 2007 to make it more accessible by modernizing the platforms and installing elevators.

The platforms are linked by a passage under the tracks, but each has its own separate access to the street. The Zona Universitària bound platform has access to Drassanes Avenue and Portal de la Santa Madrona, while the Trinitat Nova bound platform has access to the central promenade of La Rambla

References

External links
 
 Transports Metropolitans de Barcelona
 Information about the station
 Information and photos about the station at Trenscat.com
 History and antique photos about the station

Transport in Ciutat Vella
Railway stations in Spain opened in 1968
El Raval
Barcelona Metro line 3 stations